Karin Swart is a South African former cricketer who played as a bowler. She appeared in three One Day Internationals for South Africa in 1997, all at the 1997 World Cup. She played domestic cricket for Northerns.

References

External links
 
 

Living people
Year of birth missing (living people)
Date of birth missing (living people)
Place of birth missing (living people)
South African people of Dutch descent
South African women cricketers
South Africa women One Day International cricketers
Northerns women cricketers